Isabel Glasser (born May 1, 1958) is an American actress who appeared in the movies Forever Young (1992), Pure Country (1992), Mother (1996), Second Chances (1998) and Mentor (2006); and on television in several of the shows within the Law & Order franchise.

Filmography

Film

Television

References

External links

1958 births
Living people
People from Niagara County, New York